Edward Robert "Butch" Sanicki (July 7, 1923 – July 6, 1998) was an American professional baseball player.

Sanicki signed with the Phillies after serving in the U.S. Navy in World War II. On September 14, 1949 — in his first at-bat in the Major Leagues — he hit a three-run home run off Rip Sewell of the Pittsburgh Pirates. In , during spring training, he injured his knee. Although he made the Phils in 1951, his final major-league game was on May 12. During his two MLB trials, Sanicki registered only 17 at bats — but of his five hits, three were home runs and one was a double.

After leaving baseball in 1952, Sanicki graduated from Seton Hall University and became a special-education teacher in New Jersey.

He died on July 6, 1998, in Old Bridge Township, New Jersey, and is buried at Holy Cross Burial Park, East Brunswick, N.J.

See also
Home run in first Major League at-bat

Further reading
Dennis Snelling: A Glimpse of Fame, McFarland & Company, Jefferson N.C., 1993, pp. 19–34

References

External links

1923 births
1998 deaths
Baseball players from New Jersey
Houston Buffaloes players
Major League Baseball outfielders
Clifton High School (New Jersey) alumni
Sportspeople from Clifton, New Jersey
People from Wallington, New Jersey
People from Old Bridge Township, New Jersey
Philadelphia Phillies players
Schenectady Blue Jays players
Seton Hall Pirates baseball players
Toronto Maple Leafs (International League) players
Tulsa Oilers (baseball) players
Wilmington Blue Rocks (1940–1952) players